Indian Institute of Metals (IIM) was formed in Kolkata in 1946 under the leadership of Dr. Dara P. Antia, who was then Chief Metallurgist of Indian Aluminum Co. The IIM is over 60 years old premier professional Metallurgical Institute set up to promote and advance the study and practice of the Science and the art of making and treating of metals and alloys and to promote just an honourable practice in Metallurgical profession. The space for its office at Calcutta was provided by Tata Steel. The Institute was inaugurated on 29 December 1947 at the Royal Asiatic Society Hall, Calcutta

The institute has chapters in almost all important towns and cities of India.  
                                                                      
This institute is popular for providing distance courses for those who want to pursue Btech in metallurgy by distance mode. Normally Exams are taken in twice per year (End of June and December).

External links 
 Home page of the institute
 <http://www.iim-kolkata.com><http://www.iim-kolkata.com/>

1946 establishments in India
Scientific societies based in India
Professional associations based in India
Metallurgical industry in India
Research institutes established in 1946